Hasanabad-e Kareyak (also Romanized as Ḩasanābād-e Kareyak; also known as Ḩasanābād) is a village in Dana Rural District, in the Central District of Dana County, Kohgiluyeh and Boyer-Ahmad Province, Iran. At the 2006 census, its population was 66, in 15 families.

References 

Populated places in Dana County